The Penang Floating Mosque, also known as Tanjung Bungah Floating Mosque is a floating mosque located in Tanjung Bungah near George Town, Penang, Malaysia.

History

A small mosque was first built in the area in 1967 and it was expanded in In 1977 so that it may accommodate 500 worshipers. With increasing population, it soon became too small for the local Muslim community, but with limited land to expand, an idea was then proposed to build the mosque out to the sea. The construction of the new mosque started in 2003, and cost RM15 million to build.  It was first opened to the public in January 2005. It was officially opened on 16 March 2007 by the fifth Malaysian Prime Minister, Datuk Seri Abdullah Ahmad Badawi.

Features
Although it is called a floating mosque, the mosque is actually built on stilts, only at high tide would it have the appearance of floating on water. It is built in a mix of Middle Eastern and local architectural style and features a prominent minaret. The mosque can accommodate 1,500 worshipers.

See also

 Tengku Tengah Zaharah Mosque, Floating Mosque of Kuala Terengganu
 Islam in Malaysia

References

Mosques in Penang
Mosques completed in 2007
2007 establishments in Malaysia
Mosque buildings with domes